Miralda agana is a species of sea snail, a marine gastropod mollusc in the family Pyramidellidae, the pyrams and their allies.

Distribution
This marine species was found off Port Alfred, Eastern Cape, South Africa.

References

External links
 To World Register of Marine Species

Pyramidellidae
Gastropods described in 1915